Isle of Bute is one of the eleven wards used to elect members of the Argyll and Bute Council. It elects three Councillors.

Councillors

Election Results

2022 Election
2022 Argyll and Bute Council election

2021 by-election 
Councillor Len Scoullar died on 15 November 2020 following a battle with illness. The by-election took place on 18 March 2021.

2017 Election
2017 Argyll and Bute Council election

2012 Election
2012 Argyll and Bute Council election

2007 Election
2007 Argyll and Bute Council election

References

Wards of Argyll and Bute
Isle of Bute
Firth of Clyde